Stop That Laughing At The Back was a children's comedy sketch series that aired on the ITV network for one series in 1987. It was produced by Granada Television. 

The programme used surreal animated sequences to link sketches, similar to Monty Python's Flying Circus.

British children's comedy television series
ITV children's television shows